Merlara is a comune (municipality) in the Province of Padua in the Italian region of Veneto, located about  southwest of Venice and about  southwest of Padua.

Merlara borders the following municipalities: Casale di Scodosia, Castelbaldo, Masi, Piacenza d'Adige, Terrazzo, Urbana.

Demographic evolution

Merlara DOC
Italian wine, both red, white and frizzante, under the Merlara DOC appellation have been produced in this region since 2000. Grapes destined for DOC production must be harvested up to a maximum yield of 12 tonnes/hectare with the finished wines fermented to a minimum alcohol level of 11%.

Red Merlara wines are a blend of primarily 50-70% Merlot with up to 50% of other local, non-aromatic red grape varieties permitted to fill in the remainder of the blend. White Merlara is made from 50 to 70% Friulano with up to 50% of other local white grape varieties permitted to fill in the remainder. Other wines produced in the region include a slightly sparkling frizzante made from Marzemino and varietal wines made from Merlot, Friulano and other varieties provided that constitute at least 85% of the designated variety.

References

Cities and towns in Veneto